The fictional portrayal of the Solar System has often included planets, moons, and other celestial objects which do not actually exist in reality. Some of these objects were, at one time, seriously considered as hypothetical planets which were either thought to have been observed, or were hypothesized to be orbiting the Sun in order to explain certain celestial phenomena. Often such objects continued to be used in literature long after the hypotheses upon which they were based had been abandoned.

Other non-existent Solar System objects used in fiction have been proposed or hypothesized by persons with no scientific standing; yet others are purely fictional and were never intended as serious hypotheses about the structure of the Solar System.

Vulcan 

Vulcan was a hypothetical planet supposed to revolve around the Sun inside the orbit of Mercury, invoked to explain certain irregularities in Mercury's orbit.  The planet was proposed as a hypothesis in 1859, and abandoned not later than 1915.

 "Vulcan's Workshop" (Astounding Stories, June 1932), short story by Harl Vincent: a penal colony is located on Vulcan.
 "At the Center of Gravity" (Astounding Stories, June 1936), short story by Ross Rocklynne: two people are trapped inside a hollow Vulcan.
 Vulcan is part of the Solar System in the Captain Future series. Despite being said to be covered in magma, in Outlaw World (1946) it is discovered that it is hollow and inhabited inside.
 Mission to Mercury (1965), science fiction novel by Hugh Walters. During the return of the first crewed flight to Mercury, a crew member notices a dark spot moving across the Sun.  Since the spot is between them and the Sun and appears to be moving to the naked eye, it can only be the previously-hypothetical Vulcan; it must be moving rapidly and extremely close to the Sun.
 Vulcan is visited in the 1882 novel A Thousand Years Hence by Nunsowe Green.
Sailor Moon musicals (1993–2005): A planet called Vulcan along with its moon, Astarte, is said to be on the other side of the Sun.

The name "Vulcan" has been used for various other fictional planets, in and out of the Solar System, that do not correspond to the hypothetical planet Vulcan. The planet Vulcan in the Star Trek franchise, for instance, is specified as orbiting 40 Eridani A.

Counter-Earth 

Counter-Earth was a hypothetical planet sharing an orbit with Earth, but on the opposite side of the Sun (hence Earth and Counter-Earth would always be invisible to each other). The idea of a counter-Earth has never been a serious scientific hypothesis in modern times.

Books
 Korad by Felix Mondejar: A Counter-Earth planet inhabited by an advanced alien race that has (mis)guided humankind through several turning points in history by mistake, miscalculation and underestimation of humankind's ability to see meaning where there isn't any. The planet is used in the Korad trilogy of Science Fiction-comedy books by Cuban writer Felix Móndejar (pen name F. Mond).
 Planetoid 127 (1924) by Edgar Wallace: A short novel of communication by radio with another world on the other side of the Sun in Earth's orbit.
 Antigeos series of novels including The Other Side of the Sun (1950), The Other Half of the Planet (1952) and Down to Earth (1954) by Paul Capon (also serialised on radio by the BBC): Set on the counter-Earth Antigeos.
 La Dixième Planète (1954) by C. H. Badet
 Out of this World (1960) by Ben Barzman, also published as Twinkle Twinkle Little Star and Echo X: The two worlds were exact twins until they diverged in the early 20th century.
 La Planète ignorée (1963) by René Guillot
 Gor novels (1967-) by John Norman: Sword and planet adventure on a counter-Earth called "Gor".
 Aïo, terre invisible (1973) by Christian Grenier
 The Illuminatus! Trilogy (1975) by Robert Shea and Robert Anton Wilson: The leaders of the Illuminati may have originated on a counter-Earth named Vulcan and come to Earth on flying saucers from Mars via Saturn.
 The X12 series of books (1975–1980) by Olof Möller prominently features a counter-Earth called Anti-Tellus.
 Zillikian is a counter-Earth featured in the Bunduki series (1975–1990) by J. T. Edson.
 Rejsen til planeten Droj ["Journey to planet Droj", with droj being jord ("earth") backwards] (1977) by Thorstein Thomsen features the inhabitants of planet Droj inviting humans to visit them. The children who arrive on the planet see almost a mirror image of Earth and learn about the dangers Earth may also face eventually.
 Countersolar! (1985) by Richard A. Lupoff, a sequel to Circumpolar!: A parody in which the Earth is a disk rather than a ball, and a lab accident creates a counter-Earth that's initially an exact duplicate of the original.
 The King and the Fire Chanter (2007) by Arran Wend: Two children, born and raised on Earth, escape to their planet of origin on the other side of the Sun.

Comics
Twin Earths (1952–1963), comic strip by Alden McWilliams (art 1952–63, story 1957–63) and Oskar Lebeck (story 1952–57). The counter-Earth Terra orbits opposite Earth.  The daily strip featured Vana, a Terran spy living on Earth to keep tabs on our technology, and Garry Verth, an FBI agent. In the Sunday strip, a young Texan named Punch explored Terra with its young prince Torro. This strip mostly consisted of travelogue-like views of Terran life; for example the fact that in their liberated society, women, who constituted 92% of the population, ran things.
Since 1972, Marvel Comics has published stories featuring three versions of a counter-Earth.
 Judge Dredd (1977-), comic strip in the 2000 AD comic anthology. Hestia is a planet which orbits the Sun at nearly the same distance as the Earth but at such an angle to the ecliptic plane that it was not discovered until 2009. It is inhabited by a small colony of humans and an intelligent indigenous population who keep their distance from the colonists. The planet is also home of the lethal Dune Sharks (flying shark-like predators which can burrow beneath the ground).
New Krypton (2008–2009) and Superman: World of New Krypton story arcs in the DC Comics Superman series: New Krypton is a counter-Earth created by Kryptonian scientists using Brainiac's technology.
Terra Nova (1960–1966). In the Danish weekly comic 'Willy på eventyr', a continuation of the British 'Rob the Rover', Willy and his crew of spaceship SM-4 journeys to the counter-earth Terra Nova, home of several civilisations.
Non Sequitur (2009). Jeffrey's alien friend Lars is from Mars 3.5, a planet described as "Earth's twin". Jeffrey and Danae visit it, and it is indicated that Captain Eddie has paid a visit to this planet as well.
Tom the Dancing Bug (1990-), a satirical comic strip by Ruben Bolling. The strip occasionally features Counter-Earth, a "strange world that is not quite the opposite of our own...but somewhat dissimilar in certain ways."

Television and radio
 The Adventures of Superman radio series, episode 1 (debuting February 12, 1940): the planet Krypton is said to be "situated on the other side of the Sun" from the Earth.
 The 2000 Plus episode "Worlds Apart" (broadcast 1950-11-15) involves a planet "exactly opposite the Earth, on the other side of the sun" (but, inexplicably, slightly closer) named Vesta (not to be confused with the real asteroid by that name).
 Beyond the Sun/The Hidden Planet, a scripted but unfilmed early story for Doctor Who, was set on a counter-Earth that was almost an exact duplicate of Earth. This idea was reused in the original series (1966) as Mondas, the original home of the Cybermen.
 Sport Billy, 1979 television cartoon: the eponymous hero is from the counter-Earth Olympus, populated by athletic god-like beings.
 Dinosaucers, 1987 television cartoon: premised on intelligent dinosaurs coming to Earth from a counter-Earth called Reptilon.
 Lexx, television series (1997–2002): The twin planets "Fire" and "Water" are on the opposite side of the Sun from Earth.
 Spider-Man Unlimited, 1999 animated series: Spider-Man tries to rescue John Jameson on a counter-Earth.
 In a Saturday Night Live skit, Father Guido Sarducci announced a planet on the other side of the Sun, exactly like Earth except that they eat corn on the cob with the corn positioned north–south instead of west–east.

Film
, 1956 science fiction tokusatsu film by Daiei. Planet R is on a collision course with Earth. One-eyed, starfish-shaped aliens from the counter-Earth Planet Paira take on human forms to warn the earth about the impending disaster.
Gamera vs. Guiron, 1969 tokusatsu kaiju film: Gamera travels to a counter-Earth planet named Terra in order to save a pair of kidnapped children. Terra once had a race similar to humanity, but all but two of the aliens were exterminated by a space-faring species of Gyaos; only the cannibalistic sisters Barbella and Florbella are still alive, protected by their monster, the guard dog-like Guiron. At the end of the film, Gamera manages to defeat Guiron after a long and difficult battle, with both Terrans dying in the crossfire.
Doppelgänger, 1969 film by Gerry Anderson. Counter-Earth is identical to Earth in every respect except that left and right are reversed. Marketed in the US as Journey to the Far Side of the Sun.
The Stranger, 1973 film. Terra, the film's counter-Earth, is culturally and evolutionarily identical to Earth in nearly every respect; the most obvious differences are Terra's three moons and the fact that everyone is left-handed.  However, it appears to have diverged significantly from Earth sometime in the last century or two.  An astronaut from Earth crashes there, and discovers a strange dictatorship known as the Perfect Order.  Technology is about the same, although geared for such purposes as monitoring of the population to assure adherence to the Order
Another Earth, a 2011 film written by and starring Brit Marling about the discovery of an identical Earth.

Other
Mage: The Ascension (1993), role-playing game: A planetoid called Autochthonia exists in the counter-Earth position in the game's cosmology.  This is the location of The Computer which is central to Iteration X, the cybernetic convention of mages.
Antikhthon (Greek for 'Counter-Earth'), a piece of music by Iannis Xenakis

Phaëton 

Phaëton is a name given to a supposed planet existing in the past between the orbits of Mars and Jupiter, which no longer exists, having become the Solar System's asteroid belt. Proposed not long after the discovery of multiple asteroids at the beginning of the 19th century, the idea that the asteroids were fragments of a single planet was gradually abandoned over the course of the middle decades of the 20th century in favor of the conclusion that no planet had ever accreted in the region of the asteroid belt in the first place.

In fiction, various other names were given to the same or similar concepts.

 Seola (1878), novel by Ann Eliza Smith: mentions the existence of a Wan Planet, "a great planet between the Red World [Mars] and the Green [Jupiter]; uninhabited, cracked, and fissured, deep-seamed and rent by volcanic fire. Deep, jarring, splitting sounds now issue from the centre of this desolate orb : it is about to fall in pieces. Its disruption will endanger the Earth", leading to the deluge of Genesis.
 "Time Wants a Skeleton" (Astounding Science Fiction, June 1941), short story by Ross Rocklynne: characters travel through time to Phaeton, an Earth-like planet, just before it was destroyed in a collision with another (unnamed) planet.
 "The Lost World of Time" (Captain Future Magazine, Fall 1941), a Captain Future story by Edmond Hamilton: characters travel through time to the planet Katain and rescue the inhabitants before it was destroyed. Adapted to Japanese anime in 1978, where the planet is named Prometheus.
 Et la planète sauta... (1946), novel by B. R. Bruss, tells of a planet that once existed between Mars and Jupiter called Rhama.
 Space Cadet (1948), juvenile novel by Robert A. Heinlein. The hero's first assignment after graduation from the Space Patrol's academy is to a ship charting the intractable Asteroid Belt. He has the luck to be involved in a startling discovery: not only is the Belt proven to be what is left of an exploded planet Lucifer, but also remains are found of that planet's inhabitants, who had been responsible for its destruction.
 In "Letter to a Phoenix", (1949), a short story by Fredric Brown, it is mentioned that one of the human civilizations which existed before has destroyed the fifth planet, named Skora.
 Return to Mars (1955) juvenile novel by W. E. Johns.  The fifth planet, called Kraka, was accidentally destroyed in a nuclear experiment carried out by its inhabitants.
 Chikyu Boeigun (The Mysterians, 1957). A newly discovered asteroid in the asteroid belt is the Mysterians' home planet, Mysteroid, rendered uninhabitable as the result of a nuclear war.
 Rogue in Space (1957), novel by Fredric Brown. A living, intelligent, asteroid collects all the asteroids in the Belt and forms them into a planet with himself at its centre.  In this variant, the fifth planet exists not in the past but in the future.
 Fallen Star (1959), novel by James Blish.  The fifth planet, called Nferetet, may have been destroyed by the Martians because they saw its inhabitants as a threat.
 Stranger in a Strange Land (1961), novel by Robert A. Heinlein. An unnamed fifth planet was destroyed by Martians after they deemed its inhabitants too barbaric to be allowed to exist. "[The Martians] encountered the people of the fifth planet ... and had taken action; asteroid ruins were all that remained."
 Keith Laumer's Worlds of the Imperium (1962) features, among a great variety of alternative history timelines. several in which Earth was broken up and its fragments scattered to make an asteroid belt. 
 The protagonist of Poul Anderson's The Corridors of Time (1965), who becomes involved in the war of two mutually-antagonistic factions from the far future, finds that an earlier phase of the war between them caused the planet Mars to break up into an asteroid belt. This cataclysm forced the two contending parties to adopt more subtle methods of warfare, mainly involving time travel.
 In Das Zeitauge (1966), a novel by H. G. Ewers, Zeut, the fifth planet of the Sun in the Perry Rhodan Universe, was destroyed by aggressive aliens, 50,068 B.C.. Also in the anthology Lemuria.
 In "Destination: Saturn", (1967), a novel by Donald Wollheim writing as David Grinnell, and Lin Carter, an ancient spaceship created by the dead occupants of the fifth planet is found to contain many weapons useful to Earth in its war against Saturn. The novel also features a visit to a moon of Jupiter found to have been part of the former planet's core, and a discussion of its destruction.
 Brian Lumley's story collection The Caller of the Black (1971), which contains many contributions to the Cthulhu Mythos, references Thyoph, a planet originally orbiting between Mars and Jupiter that was destroyed by an aspect of Azathoth.
 "The Ultimate Crime" (1976), a short story by Isaac Asimov, was actually based on the author's essay to qualify for entry into the Baker Street Irregulars, a group of Sherlock Holmes enthusiasts. In it, he speculates that Professor Moriarty's The Dynamics of an Asteroid was a scholarly work that attempted to compute how the hypothetical fifth planet had exploded, and how to repeat the effect on Earth.
 Inherit the Stars (1977), first in the Giants series of novels by James P. Hogan. The planet Minerva exploded due to nuclear war 50,000 years ago to form the asteroid belt with the largest remnant thrown out of Minerva's orbit to form Pluto. It was home to two intelligent races: the Giants 25 million years ago, and the Lunarians (nearly identical to modern man) 50,000 years ago. Also mentioned in the novels The Gentle Giants of Ganymede (1978), Giants' Star (1981), Entoverse (1991) and Mission to Minerva (2005).
 In L. Neil Smith's  The Venus Belt (1980), an alternate history  space-faring Libertarian society deliberately blows up the planet Venus, with the reasoning that due to its extreme heat  the intact planet is completely useless to humans while if Venus is broken up into a new asteroid belt it could open up great mineral wealth.
In the Doctor Who story Image of the Fendahl (1977) the fifth planet was the home of the Fendahl, a malevolent entity that consumed all life. The Time Lords placed the planet in a time loop in the hope of imprisoning the creature, but it escaped and arrived on Earth 12 million years ago in the form of a human skull.
 Andromeda Stories (1980–1982) by Keiko Takemiya & Ryu Mitsuse: a pair of robot characters who hail from Phaeton have been sent to explore the Andromeda galaxy, and find their home planet destroyed upon their return.
 Gall Force 2: Destruction (1987), depicts the 5th planet, Damia, is in fact a massive super weapon, the System Destroyer, intended to act as a trap to destroy the two opposing forces. It is sabotaged and destroyed, resulting in the current asteroid field.
 In Frank Chadwick's Space: 1889 RPG Steampunk system (introduced 1989), Vulcan is the ancient home to the Vulcan race, and was positioned between Mars and Jupiter. Its destruction (due to being old; increasing distance from the Sun symbolizes evolutionary progress) created the asteroid belt.
 Faety (The Destruction of Faena), 1989 novel by Alexander Kazantsev. In this adaptation of Shakespeare's Romeo and Juliet, the asteroid belt is the debris of Faena, the fifth planet of the Solar System located just between Mars and Jupiter. Faena was destroyed thousands of years before the first civilizations of Earth appeared, following the activation of a doomsday device-like thermonuclear super weapon built by the native sentient species and the few of them who survived the explosion (by launching into space) had to seek refuge on Mars and Earth. The homo sapiens genus is thus assumed to be a mixture of local DNA and the Faetan genes.
 Starting with a Swamp Thing story by Doug Wheeler in 1991, stories from DC Comics proposed that a former fifth planet was the original home of all fungal life (and a fungal group mind, The Grey), which migrated to Earth on a meteorite.
 Mutineers' Moon (1991), novel by David Weber. The asteroid belt was a planet that was geologically unstable. The Achuultani attacked the planet with kinetic weapons, shattering it, and then attacked Earth, resulting in the extinction of the dinosaurs.
 Final Fantasy IV (1991), video game. The fifth planet is populated by a race of highly advanced humanoids who are aware that their planet is unstable. Thus they travel to Earth and craft a second moon to live on as the fifth planet explodes to create the asteroid belt. The character FuSoYa is a member of this race, which is called the Lunarians due to their living on the moon (the true name of their race is not said).
 The Werewolf: The Apocalypse roleplaying game (introduced 1992) names the former planet Turog, governed by a planetary incarna (concept spirit) named Rorg the Hunter.
 End of an Era (1994), Robert J Sawyer. A time travel novel that explores the idea that Phaeton was not yet destroyed when this story takes place.
 Ocean (2004), comic by Warren Ellis: discusses the possibility of an ancient proto-human culture originating on Phaeton.
 "The Four-And-A-Halfth Planet" (2006) by Sam Hughes describes a planet, Tjörd, that formed from the current asteroid belt while the Earth is destroyed and becomes a new asteroid belt in an alternate timeline.
 Exiles #4 (June 2008): When the super hero group known as Exiles travel to a parallel dimension, they find out there is no asteroid belt, but a planet called Hera, which humans have not terraformed yet, although they have already terraformed Venus and Mars.
 The manga series Terra Formars (introduced 2011), regularly mentions a planet named Rahab that once existed between Mars and Jupiter that was shattered following a cometary impact.

Trans-Neptunian planets 

Fictional planets in the Solar System beyond the orbit of Neptune have been employed many times as settings or references in science fiction. Following the general reception of Pluto as the ninth planet of the Solar System in 1930, a hypothetical additional planet was sometimes called a "tenth planet".  Since 1992, a very large number of objects have been found beyond Neptune; all the objects in the following list, however, are purely fictional. Common names for trans-Neptunian planets in fiction include Planet X, after a planet once believed to lie beyond Neptune, Persephone (or Proserpina), after the wife of Pluto, and Minerva, after the Roman goddess of wisdom and education (which would fit with a planet discovered through mathematical predictions rather than direct observation).

Literature
In the Year 2889 (1889) short story by Jules Verne: Olympus is a massive planet beyond Neptune. It has a mean distance of 11,400,799,642 miles from the Sun (about 4 times the distance of Neptune), and orbits the Sun in 1311 years, 294 days, 12 hours, 43 minutes, and 9 seconds.
 A Journey in Other Worlds (1894) by John Jacob Astor IV has an icy trans-Neptunian planet named Cassandra that houses the souls of unworthy Earthlings.
Their Winged Destiny (1912) by Donald W. Horner: Astronauts travelling to Alpha Centauri pass a planet beyond Neptune as they leave the Solar System.
The Whisperer in Darkness (1930), short story by H. P. Lovecraft, and other stories of the Cthulhu mythos by various writers: Lovecraft identifies Yuggoth (or Iukkoth) with Pluto, but other writers in the mythos claim that it is actually an enormous, trans-Neptunian world that orbits perpendicularly to the ecliptic of the Solar System, accompanied by three moons: Nithon, Thog and Thok. Italian astronomer Albino Carbognani has suggested that any real-life planet discovered beyond Pluto might be named Yuggoth.
 Rescue Party (1946), a short story by Arthur C. Clarke. A reference is made to a starship "passing the orbit of Persephone"; from context, it is clearly a trans-Neptunian planet, and not the asteroid 399 Persephone (the story also states that there are ten planets in the Solar System). Earthlight (1951) and Rendezvous with Rama (1973) (see below), also by Clarke, again make reference to Persephone.
 The Puppet Masters (1951), novel by Robert A. Heinlein: The next planet after Pluto is called Kalki.
A Life for the Stars (1962) by James Blish (collected in Cities in Flight, 1970) has a trans-Plutonian planet called Proserpina.
Known Space books (1964-) by Larry Niven: Persephone is a small gas giant with a single moon, Kobold. In The Borderland of Sol (1975), which takes place ca. 2640, Pluto is dismissed as an escaped moon of Neptune, while the solar system's outer planets are listed as Neptune, Persephone, Caïna, Antenora, and Ptolemea, after the rounds of Cocytus in Dante's Inferno, with Judecca reserved for the next discovery.
Charlie and the Great Glass Elevator (1972), children's story by Roald Dahl: The Vermicious knids are said to be from Vermes, a planet 18,427,000,000 miles from Earth (about 5 times the distance of Pluto).
Rendezvous with Rama (1973) postulates a tenth planet named Persephone which is represented by the Ambassador of Triton.
The Tenth Planet (1973), a novel set upon the rocky planet Minerva, beyond the orbit of Pluto. Minervans, human colonists who escaped ecological disaster on Earth and Mars, live in underground cities; above ground, the planet is so cold as to have lakes of liquid helium.
The Forever War (1974) by Joe Haldeman. The first part of the novel is set on a trans-Plutonian planet called Charon. (This is not Pluto's moon, as the story was written before Charon's discovery in 1978.)
Schrödinger's Cat trilogy (1980) by Robert Anton Wilson. The tenth planet is named Mickey and the eleventh Goofy (after characters in Disney cartoons).

Mostly Harmless (1992) by Douglas Adams. The tenth planet is officially called Persephone, but nicknamed Rupert (after "some astronomer's parrot"), and is inhabited by the crew of a spaceship who have forgotten almost everything about their mission, except that they are supposed to be "monitoring" something.
The Tenth Planet trilogy (1999–2000) by Dean Wesley Smith and Kristine Kathryn Rusch: A tenth planet, roughly twice the size of the Moon, circles the Sun and its alien inhabitants periodically harvest Earth's resources.  The periodicity of these raids is a consequence of the tenth planet's highly elliptical 2,006-year orbit, which closely approaches Earth only on two occasions near the tenth planet's perihelion.  The tenth planet, known as Malmur to its inhabitants, is in fact a captured rogue planet, ejected from its original solar system.
Galileo's Dream (2009) by Kim Stanley Robinson There are several outer gas giants named, some of which are described as having been converted into energy for time travel. The tenth planet is named Hades.
Take Back the Sky (2016), the third book of the War Dogs trilogy reveals that numerous trans-Neptunian planets exist in the distant outer reaches of the Solar System.  The homeworld of the alien Antags (Antagonists) is one such planet. Called the Sun-Planet, it is an artificial world consisting of a thin solid surface wrapped around a low-density gaseous interior, five times the mass of Jupiter and nearly the diameter of the Sun.  The Sun-Planet is kept at a habitable temperature by artificial fusion at its core.
 Included in the Ad Astra Per Aspera canon (2019-present) on the SCP Foundation website is the entry SCP-4774 - The Ninth Planet [] (2018). SCP-4774 is an ontological anomaly concerning the hypothetical "Planet Nine", a trans-Neptunian gas giant potentially orbiting the sun at a distance of around 700 AU. Anyone considering SCP-4774's existence will universally arrive at the same hypotheses, regardless of their prior astronomical knowledge. A research spacecraft sent to confirm SCP-4774 went missing, and was recovered 34 days later than their mission's intended end. The crew had no memory of their mission's events, but had new hypotheses; if it existed, SCP-4774 would be incapable of supporting intelligent life; if such life could exist, proving or disproving the possibility of their existence would threaten their continued existence/inexistence.

Film, TV, and radio
The Tenth Planet, radio play broadcast Sept. 7, 1952 on Hollywood Star Playhouse. It starred Joseph Cotten, Hans Conreid, and Joan Banks Lovejoy.  Cotten is kidnapped by aliens inhabiting a planet beyond Pluto.
 In the 1975 TV series Star Maidens, the planet ruled by women is known as Medusa. Described by one of the Medusans as being "on the outer limits of your solar system", the opening titles of the premiere episode indicates that a comet pulled Medusa out of orbit around Proxima Centauri—forcing its people underground—and it eventually slipped into orbit around the Earth's Sun. No longer in the heat of Proxima Centauri, Medusa is small, rocky and cold, though the Medusans have the technology to conduct industrial operations on the surface.
 Star Trek Maps, a 1970s publication by Bantam Books, indicates that the Star Trek universe includes a tenth planet in the Solar System called Persephone that orbits at a great distance from the Sun. This statement is not supported by any Star Trek film or TV episode (the original series episode "The Changeling" mentions only nine planets exist in the Solar System), and a later, similar work, Star Trek Star Charts by Pocket Books, makes no mention of this world.
 ALF (1986–1990): In one episode, ALF reveals to Brian that two planets exist beyond Pluto. When Willie sarcastically asks if they are named "Mickey" and "Donald," ALF matter-of-factly tells him no; they are named "Dave" and "Alvin." Later Willie explains that "Dave" could be Chiron, a minor planet once labeled the "tenth planet" by the press.
 K-PAX (2001 film): An alien character played by Kevin Spacey tells the character played by Jeff Bridges that there are ten planets in Bridges's Solar System.
 The cartoon Duck Dodgers in the 24 1/2 Century features astronauts Daffy Duck and Porky Pig looking for "Planet X", and then having to battle Marvin the Martian for it.

Animation
 In the anime series The Vision of Escaflowne (1996), there exists an invisible (from Earth) third member of the Earth-Moon system, called Gaea, on which the majority of the story takes place. The Earth, which is visible in the Gaean sky along with the Moon, is referred to as the "Mystic Moon".
 In the anime series Space Battleship Yamato (1974) there are eleven planets in the Solar System. In the English dub, the first season names the tenth planet Minerva (destroyed by the Gamilons, it's not clear if it became an entire asteroid belt or just a large asteroid field), and the second season names the eleventh planet Brumus (attacked by the Comet Empire).
 In the Dragon Ball series (1989–1996), there's a tenth Planet or a brown dwarf called the Makyo Star. Every 12,000 years, it passes close to Earth which powers all the Makyo demons inhabiting Earth.
 In the Sailor Moon series (1992–1997), there exists a tenth Planet called Nemesis which is controlled by the villains of the Black Moon Clan. The planet is said to be radiating negative energy and can disappear from sight, only trackable via X-rays.
 In the animated television series Exosquad (1993), the Solar System contains an invisible tenth planet composed of dark matter. It was discovered by the Pirate Clans who named it Chaos and later offered it as safe haven to the Exofleet.
 In the Mutant Chronicles universe (1993), the 10th Planet, Nero, is the home of portals used by The Dark Legion to gain access into our galaxy through which they plan to enslave or destroy mankind.  The planet is named after the Imperial Cardinal who had prophetic visions of the black planet, visions which also warned him of death.
 In the animated series The Fairly OddParents (2001), the character Mark Chang is from the planet Yugopotamia (which bears an uncanny resemblance to Yuggoth; see above) which is stated in the episode "Totally Spaced Out" to be "one million, one million" miles away from Earth (almost 10,760 astronomical units; within the bounds of the Oort cloud).

Other
Camelot 3000 (1982), comic book: Scientists discover a tenth planet in 3000 AD. It is later revealed to be the homeworld whence the aliens (led by Morgana LeFay) attack Earth. Eventually King Arthur and his Knights of the Round Table are teleported there with the help of the Lady of the Lake.
 2001 Nights (1984), manga by Yukinobu Hoshino, Night 7, "Lucifer Rising": A tenth planet dubbed Lucifer and its three moons Cassius, Brutus, and Judas (named after the souls gnawed on by the heads of Dante's Satan in Dante's Inferno) are discovered. The expedition to Lucifer becomes a perilous and tragic one when it is discovered that Lucifer is composed of antimatter.
Godzilla: Monster of Monsters (1989), video game: Planet X is said to initially exist between Neptune and Pluto and causes the two planets to switch positions in the solar system while Planet X itself becomes the literal tenth planet in the system and is shown to be artificial, though mountains and jungles exist on it.
Galaxy 5000 (1991), videogame: Planet X the last stage, after finishing Pluto, which suggests it to be the next planet in the series.
Battlezone II: Combat Commander (1999), computer game: A tenth planet called Dark Planet is not discovered for some time because it was obscured by the Kuiper belt.
Elite: Dangerous (2014), video game: At some point before the 3300s, a ninth planet named Persephone (based on the hypothetical Planet Nine) was charted in the Solar System, and can be traveled to and explored. The planet is depicted as an airless ice planet with active geysers; it has a semi-major axis of 700 AU, a radius of 14,427 km, a gravity of 1.95G, a surface temperature of 20K, a mass 9.9997 times the mass of the Earth, and an orbital period of 15,000 years.
 Gemini Home Entertainment (2019-present), analog horror series: A sentient tenth planet named The Iris serves as the series main antagonist. Having arrived in the solar system as a rogue planet at an unknown point prior to the series, it is masterminding an ongoing assault on it, and is directly responsible for the existence of several alien creatures which serve as part of its plans to subjugate Earth and humanity. The Iris has five moons - Vitreous, Macula, Umbilic, Cyst and Yucous - and through unknown means is capable of 'mutating' other planets; among the planets that have been manipulated by The Iris in this way are Neptune - which has been successfully converted into The Iris's 'lens', and is observed firing an intense beam of light towards the inner solar system - and Jupiter, which was attacked but unsuccessfully mutated, as its Great Red Spot is described in the series as 'an open wound'.
 Magnus, Robot Fighter: 4,000 A.D. (1963), comic book: Planet X, presumably a tenth planet beyond Pluto, serves as the original hideout for Xyrkol, and is referred to by Magnus (in a thought balloon) as "the planet that is supposed to be uninhabitable".

Elsewhere in the Solar System 
 Monster Zero (怪獣大戦争, Kaijū Daisensō {{literal translation|The Giant Monster War) (1965), the 6th Godzilla film: Aliens from Planet X (located between Jupiter and Saturn) try to conquer the Earth using Godzilla, Rodan, and King Ghidorah to take its water supply because water is scarce on their planet.
 The Lost Planet (1953) describes journeys to "Hesikos", a fictional asteroid with highly eccentric orbit whose humanoid inhabitants renounced nuclear power after a meltdown, but have meanwhile developed broadcast telepathy.  A happy ending ensues when Earthmen provide safe nuclear technology in return for thought projections from Hesikos to reduce fear and aggression here.
 Twin Earth: a hypothetical duplicate of the Earth and everything on it (in an unspecified location), as a thought experiment by philosopher Saul Kripke about names: the fact that everything you could say about someone or something on the Earth would be equally true of its counterpart on Twin Earth shows that names can't merely be shorthand for descriptions, as they may not uniquely identify a person/object.
 The short story "The Mysterious Finding" ("Загадочная находка") by Vladimir Obruchev (1947) features the discovery of an artificial meteorite containing the last message of a race living on a planet similar to Phaeton, though it used to be located between Earth and Mars. By the time the log is written, it is months away from being destroyed by a critical destabilization caused by nuclear bombardment of an extinct volcano.

Rogue planets

Rogue planets in fiction usually originate outside the Solar System, but their erratic paths lead them to within detectable range of Earth.  In reality, no rogue planet has ever been detected transiting the Solar System.

When Worlds Collide (1933), novel by Philip Wylie and Edwin Balmer: Extrasolar planets Bronson Alpha and Bronson Beta enter the Solar System: Bronson Alpha destroys the Earth, Bronson Beta assumes its orbit.
Flash Gordon (1934), comic by Alex Raymond: Rogue planet Mongo threatens to collide with Earth.
Super-Neutron (1941) short story by Isaac Asimov, where it is claimed that a rogue planet could cause the Sun to explode.
The Man from Planet X (1951) is an early space-alien film.  In the film, the orbit of the hitherto unknown extrasolar Planet X brings it close to Earth.
Warning from Space (1956), sci-fi film by Daiei: The rogue planet Planet R enters the solar system on a collision course with Earth. Fortunately, its arrival is detected by the Pairans, residents of a Counter-Earth planet who send an envoy to inform humanity of the threat. At the last minute, a nuclear device is developed and deployed, destroying Planet R and saving the Earth.
Fifth Planet (1963), sci-fi novel by Fred Hoyle and his son Geoffrey Hoyle: Another star is due to pass close to the Sun, close enough for conventional spacecraft to reach it. The first planets observed are four gas-giants, but then an inner 'Fifth Planet' is found. It shows signs of life, and rival Russian and US expeditions are launched to visit it.
The Tenth Planet (1966), serial of the Doctor Who TV series:  An extrasolar planet, Mondas, enters the Solar System beyond Pluto, making it temporarily the tenth planet. It originated in the Solar System with an orbit near that of Counter-Earth before the native Cybermen powered it with an engine and moved it out of the Solar System.
Breakaway, the first episode of the mid-1970s sci-fi series Space: 1999, involved an exploration of a rogue planet named Meta.
Transformers (1984) toys and spinoffs: Cybertron is a robot-inhabited rogue planet that comes close to Earth. In the Generation One cartoon timeline, this only occurs after the events of the three part episode The Ultimate Doom, in which Cybertron is brought into Earth's solar system (and specifically into Earth's actual orbit) by the use of a space bridge big enough to transport the entire planet. Afterwards, it is shown to exist somewhere reasonably close to Earth's Solar System after it is pushed out of Earth's orbit. Characters such as Starscream, Omega Supreme, and Astrotrain are later shown to be able to travel from Earth to Cybertron and back with relative ease depending on the plot of the story. Later incarnations of Cybertron are either rogue planets or else have a method of near instant transportation to and from Earth.
Sunstorm (2005), an alien race from a planet in orbit around Altair sends a rogue Jovian planet into the Sun, setting the stage for a solar storm intended to wipe out humanity in the year 2042.
Melancholia (2011), a planet emerges from behind the Sun and approaches Earth, initially passing by, before coming back on a collision course. It was written and directed by Lars von Trier.

See also
Discovery and exploration of the Solar System

References

Solar System planets, Fictional

Solar System
Solar System planets, Fictional
Planets of the Solar System